The 2016–17 Russian Bandy Super League is the 25th season of the present highest Russian men's bandy top division, Russian Bandy Super League. The regular season began on 7 November 2016, and the final was played on 26 March 2016, when SKA-Neftyanik became Russian champion for the first time.

In their last match of the regular season, Vodnik Arkhangelsk played against Baykal-Energiya. The loss apparently would make Vodnik facing a weaker team in the playoffs, therefore the team started to score own goals. Baykal-Energiya joined, apparently for fun. Vodnik won 11-9, with all goals scored in the match being own goals. The two teams are facing sanctions from the Russian Bandy Federation.

Teams

Regular season

First round

Group West

Group East

Second round

Group I

Group II

Knock-out stage

References

Bandy
Bandy
Russian Bandy Super League
Russian Bandy Super League
Seasons in Russian bandy